Rudolf Szanwald (6 July 1931 – 2 January 2013) was an Austrian football goalkeeper who played for Austria in the 1958 FIFA World Cup. He also played for Wiener Sport-Club, FC Kärnten, and FK Austria Wien.

References

External links
FIFA profile

1931 births
2013 deaths
Austrian footballers
Austria international footballers
Association football goalkeepers
Place of death missing
Wiener Sport-Club players
FC Kärnten players
FK Austria Wien players
1958 FIFA World Cup players
Footballers from Vienna